The Romanian Basketball Cup is an annual cup competition for Romanian basketball teams. The competition is played by first preliminary rounds, and then a Final Four; since 2016 the game to determine the third-placed team will not be played.

The venue of the Final Four is determined by giving one of the four teams the right to organize the tournament.



Finals

Finals top scorers

See also
 Romanian Women's Basketball Cup

References

Basketball competitions in Romania
Basketball cup competitions in Europe
1954 establishments in Romania
Recurring sporting events established in 1954